A body of films feature fictional films as part of their narrative. These are also called films within films.

List of films

See also
Story within a story

References

Further reading

External links

Faux Real: 10 Fake Movies and Shows We'd Pay to See! at VH1
The Ten Best Fake Movies Ever (Not) Made at CraveOnline
The Best Fake Movies Within Movies at SparkNotes
In a World... Within a World: The 9 Best Fake Movie Trailers from Real Movies at MTV
 Ben Yagoda's "Movies in Other Movies"

Fictional